The 1965 Missouri Tigers football team was an American football team that represented the University of Missouri in the Big Eight Conference (Big 8) during the 1965 NCAA University Division football season. The team compiled an 8–2–1 record (6–1 against Big 8 opponents), finished in second place in the Big 8, defeated Florida in the 1966 Sugar Bowl, was ranked No. 6 in the final AP Poll, and outscored opponents by a combined total of 223 to 101. Dan Devine was the head coach for the eighth of 13 seasons. The team played its home games at Memorial Stadium in Columbia, Missouri.

The team's statistical leaders included Charlie Brown with 937 rushing yards, Gary Lane with 544 passing yards, 994 yards of total offense, and 54 point scored, and Monroe Phelps with 207 receiving yards.

Schedule

Personnel
OT Francis Peay, Sr.

References

Missouri
Missouri Tigers football seasons
Sugar Bowl champion seasons
Missouri Tigers football